"Akai Ito" ( "Red Thread") is a pop song by Japanese recording artist Yui Aragaki. It was released as her second single on October 15, 2008.

Background
"Akai Ito" is a cover of one of Kobukuro's lesser known songs from their independent releases. Kobukuro's team wanted to bring focus to the song once again and suggested to the band they have a female vocalist cover it. Upon hearing Kobukuro perform the song at a Warner Music Japan Convention concert, Aragaki fell in love with the song and agreed to cover it. Aragaki's version was subsequently produced by Tokyo Jihen member Seiji Kameda.

The single was released in two formats: a limited edition, which has an illustration cover drawn by Aragaki herself and a standard edition, which comes with a bonus DVD that includes the music video for "Akai Ito" as well as its making of.

Chart performance
"Akai Ito" peaked at #1 on the daily Oricon singles chart and #3 on the weekly chart, selling 34,236 copies in its first week. The song debuted at #1 on the Billboard Japan Hot 100, making it her second consecutive number-one debut on this chart "Akai Ito" was the 15th best selling single for the month of October and ranked #120 on the yearly Oricon singles chart.

Track listing

Charts and sales

Release history

References

External links

2008 singles
2008 songs
Yui Aragaki songs
Billboard Japan Hot 100 number-one singles
Song recordings produced by Seiji Kameda
Warner Music Japan singles